Reliance Natural Resources Limited is an Indian energy company involved in sourcing, supply and transportation of gas, coal and liquid fuels. The company was incorporated on 24 March 2000 and went public on 25 July 2005. It is a part of the Reliance Anil Dhirubhai Ambani Group. Reliance Natural Resources has merged with Reliance Power.

References

External links

 
 Mudraa.com: Complete RNRL discussions and information Link

Oil and gas companies of India
Reliance Group
Companies based in Mumbai
Energy companies established in 2000
Non-renewable resource companies established in 2000
2000 establishments in Maharashtra
Indian companies established in 2000
Companies listed on the Bombay Stock Exchange